In Defence is a four-part British television legal drama series, created and partially written by Mike Cullen, that first broadcast on ITV on 26 June 2000. The series stars Ross Kemp and Sophie Okonedo, and follows Sam Lucas (Kemp), a lawyer and legal detective, who takes it upon himself to investigate cases where the police have failed to uncover enough evidence to secure a conviction. The series was co-written by Maxwell Young and Abigail Fray, and was initially billed as a "star-vehicle" for Kemp, as part of a "golden handcuffs" deal to lure Kemp away from the BBC. The series broadcast weekly until 17 July 2000.

The first episode drew in just over seven million viewers, although by the end of this series, figures had dropped to just 4.9 million. Poor ratings led to the series being axed by ITV, which in turn led to discussions regarding Kemp's contract with the broadcaster. However, following the success of Without Motive, a fellow ITV stablemate which Kemp filmed concurrently alongside In Defence, his contract was renewed, with a second series of Without Motive commissioned. The series has yet to be released on DVD, and remains unrepeated since its initial broadcast.

Production
In Defence was co-produced by Helen Gregory and Louise Mutter through Granada Television, and was one of a number of projects commissioned by the broadcaster as "star vehicles" for Ross Kemp. Each of the four episodes in the series begins by outlining details of a specific crime committed, before Lucas attempts to gather further evidence and bring the perpetrator to justice.

Despite rumours that a second series was in the pipeline, no further episodes were produced, and in November 2000, the series was axed by ITV's then head-of-drama, Nick Elliott. A behind-the-scenes documentary, Best Defence, directed by filmmaker Peter Markham, was broadcast alongside the series, detailing the journey from commission to production, as well as interviews with the cast and behind the scenes footage from the set.

Cast

Main
 Ross Kemp as Sam Lucas
 Sophie Okonedo as Bernie Kramer
 Brigid Zengeni as Martha Wilson
 Jeff Nuttall as Geoff Whelan
 Aden Gillett as James Glayzer

Supporting

Episode 1
 Liz May Brice as PC Sally Higson
 Mark Wakeling as PC Crispin Mills
 Stuart Graham as DI Paul Howard
 Peter Wight as DCI George Mercer
 James Laurenson as Michael Foulds QC
 Lorna Heilbron as Karen Squires QC

Episode 2
 Bill Fellows as DCI Bobby Calvert
 Stephen Mangan as John Henderson
 Luisa Bradshaw-White as Jackie Ellmann
 Louisa Millwood-Haigh as Alex Ellmann
 Ellen Thomas as Mrs. Hope

Episode 3
 Idris Elba as PC Paul Fraser
 Jason Pitt as PC Steve Breeze
 Ian McElhinney as DCS David Dillne
 Vincent Pickering as DS Frank Burns
 Nick Day as DCI Brian Minter
 Timothy Davies as William Cole QC

Episode 4
 Nicholas Hewetson as DI Duncan Greig
 John McArdle as DCI Brian Walsh
 Gabrielle Hamilton as Tilly Kramer
 Ursula Mohan as Ruth Kramer
 Darrel D'Silva as Terry Shepherd

Episodes

References

External links

2000 British television series debuts
2000 British television series endings
2000s British crime television series
2000s British drama television series
ITV television dramas
2000s British television miniseries
English-language television shows
Detective television series
Television series by ITV Studios
Television shows produced by Granada Television
Television shows set in London